Tsunamis affecting the British Isles are extremely uncommon, and there have only been two confirmed cases in recorded history. Meteotsunamis (displacements due to atmospheric pressure, rather than seismic shock) are somewhat more common, especially on the southern coasts of England around the English and Bristol Channels.

Confirmed tsunamis

Scotland (6100 BC)

The wave was caused by the massive underwater Storegga slide off Norway. The tsunami even washed over some of the Shetland Islands.

At the time, what became the east coast of England was connected to the areas of Denmark and the Netherlands by a low-lying land bridge, now known to archaeologists as Doggerland.  The area is believed to have had a coastline of lagoons, marshes, mudflats, and beaches, and may have been the richest hunting, fowling, and fishing ground in Europe at the time. Much of this land would have been inundated by the tsunami, with a catastrophic impact on the local human population.

Lisbon earthquake (1755)
The waves were caused by the 1755 Lisbon earthquake. The tsunami took almost four hours to reach the UK. The tsunami was also observed along the south coast of England and on the River Thames in London. Contemporary reports say that there were three of these tsunami waves, and that the sea receded very quickly, then rose up. At St Michael's Mount, the sea rose suddenly and then retired; ten minutes later, it rose  very rapidly, then ebbed equally rapidly. Although there is no record of the overall death toll, the 19th-century French writer Arnold Boscowitz claimed that "great loss of life and property occurred upon the coasts of Cornwall".

Lisbon earthquake (1761) 
At Mount's Bay in Cornwall, a small tsunami up to 1.9 meters was observed following the 1761 Portugal earthquake.

Meteotsunami (1929)

Two people drowned and the wave was attributed to a squall line travelling along the English Channel.

South coast (2011)
A small tsunami in the English Channel with a peak wave height anomaly of  occurred on 29 June 2011 affecting four counties on the south coast of England; Cornwall, Devon, Dorset and Hampshire. The tsunami was described as mild and there were no records of injuries or damage. Video footage clearly showed the tsunami and there were reports of fish leaping out the water and hair lifting up because of a static charge. Initial media speculation attributed the event to an underwater landslide, as no earthquakes were recorded at the time. However, the British Geological Survey concluded that it was unlikely to have been caused by a submarine landslide and was probably a meteotsunami.

Possible tsunamis

Orkney and Shetland (3500 BC)

Traces of a tsunami called the Garth tsunami have been reported from the Shetland Islands. The tsunami took place 5,500 years ago and may be connected to the presence of mass burials on both the Shetland and Orkney islands.

England and Wales (1014)
A widespread flood was reported in the Anglo-Saxon Chronicle to have occurred in Britain, from the coast of Cumbria to Kent, on 28 September 1014. William of Malmesbury stated that "A tidal wave... grew to an astonishing size such as the memory of man cannot parallel, so as to submerge villages many miles inland and overwhelm and drown their inhabitants." The event was also mentioned in Welsh bardic chronicles. Accounts suggest that a flood affected Kent, Sussex, Hampshire, Cumbria, and Mount's Bay in Cornwall, where the Bay was "inundated by a ‘mickle seaflood’ when many towns and people were drowned".

Dover Straits earthquake (1580)

On 6 April 1580 there was a 5.8 magnitude earthquake with its epicentre on the sea bed close to Calais. Giant waves were reported, and hundreds of people were killed when ships were sunk by the waves and the low-lying coastal land around Calais was inundated by the sea. In Dover, part of the chalk cliff collapsed, taking with it part of Dover Castle.
A contemporary French account states: "in the city of Calais such a horrible and terrible earthquake came to pass that a great part of the houses fell, and even the sea overflowed into the city and did ruin and drown a great number of houses, and numerous persons perished, and a great multitude of beasts lost which were at pasture outside this city."
In recent years, it has been suggested that these waves were a tsunami and not seiches. It is unlikely that the earthquake alone was strong enough to rupture the sea bed to trigger a tsunami, but it appears to have been sufficiently powerful to have caused an undersea landslide that was capable of generating a tsunami, as happened in Papua New Guinea in 1998, killing around 2,500 people.

Bristol Channel (1607)

The Bristol Channel floods are attributed to a storm surge, but some have suggested that it was a tsunami caused by an earthquake or a landslide from the Irish coast.

North Sea (1858)
A tsunami was reported by witnesses in England, Germany, the Netherlands and Denmark on 5 June 1858. The Times reported severe thunderstorms and flooding in the west of England on the same day. Due to the weather conditions, it may have been a meteotsunami.

Future tsunamis
In the 1990s, geologists realised that the Cumbre Vieja volcano in La Palma, in the Canary Islands off North Africa, could pose a tsunami risk to Britain and Ireland, as it is seemingly unstable. They concluded that a future volcanic eruption will result in the mass of rock alongside the volcanoes breaking off and falling into the sea as a massive landslide. This in turn will generate a huge tsunami, which will surge into the Atlantic Ocean and hit Spain, Portugal, the east coast of the United States, France, the southern and western parts of Ireland and the south coast of England. It is estimated that the waves will take around 6 hours to reach the British Isles, and that when they do they will be around 10 metres (30 ft) high. Britain would be badly hit, and it is believed by some that if nothing is done, thousands of lives will be lost. There is considerable controversy about the accuracy of these predictions. Researchers at Delft University of Technology in the Netherlands found the island to be much more stable than was widely believed, estimating that it would take at least another 10,000 years for the island to grow enough for there to be a danger.

See also
List of earthquakes in the British Isles
List of natural disasters in the British Isles

Notes

Citations

References

External links
 

Natural disasters in the United Kingdom
British
British Isles-related lists